The NECW Television Championship is a professional wrestling title in New England Championship Wrestling. The title was once unified with the PWF Mayhem Junior Heavyweight title.

Title history

External links
NECW Television Championship History
 	NECW Television Championship

Television wrestling championships